The Toyota Sera (model designation EXY10) is a 3-door 2+2 hatchback coupe manufactured and marketed by Toyota from 1990 to 1996.
 
The Sera debuted in 1988 as the Toyota AXV-II concept car in a near production-ready form, and is noted for its mostly glass roof canopy and its butterfly doors, which tilt up and forward when open.

The name "Sera" is Italian for evening and is French and Spanish for "it will be".

Overview

Released in a single engine configuration and body style, the Sera featured optional configurations for its transmission, brakes, cold climate and sound-system. Toyota marketed three trim versions, marketed as Phases, over its production and marketed the Sera exclusively in Japanese Toyota retail sales channels Toyota Corolla Store — as an alternative to the Toyota MR2, which was exclusive to Toyota Vista Store.

A total of 15,941 were built between February 1990 and December 1995. 15,852 units were registered in Japan.    Approx. 30 pre-production cars were used for development purposes.

Mechanical
The Sera came with the 1.5 L (1496 cc) inline 4 5E-FHE unleaded petrol engine, the largest capacity version of Toyota's E series of engines included in the Paseo and the Starlet. This was installed in a front-mount, front wheel drive transverse configuration with electronic fuel injection. All versions came with power assisted rack and pinion steering and either the Toyota A242L 4-speed automatic or the Toyota C155 5-speed manual transmission. The brakes were vented discs at the front and drums at the rear, unless fitted with the optional Anti-Lock Braking system which had vented discs all round.

Mechanically the car is related to both the Paseo and the Starlet, sharing similar floorpans, suspension, steering and brakes.

Design

Body

The Toyota Sera is a 3-door hatchback coupe of monocoque steel construction. The Sera's butterfly doors are hinged at the top center of the windscreen, and bottom of the A pillar and open forward and up in a manner similar to the McLaren F1 and Saleen S7 - the McLaren F1 designer Gordon Murray cited the Sera as the inspiration of the F1's door arrangement. The weight of each door is primarily supported by a thick gas strut and counterbalanced by a smaller secondary strut inside the door. Unlike conventional hinged side-opening doors, the butterfly doors can be opened fully in a fairly confined space, requiring only  of lateral clearance. The Sera features windows that curve upward into the 'roof' section of the vehicle.

The rear hatch is constructed of a single piece of glass without a supporting steel frame. This, in combination with a steeply sloping front windscreen and glass upper-door/roof panels (a total of six separate glass pieces overall), gives the Sera its distinctive canopy and provides expansive visibility, although the thick B-pillar create a significant blind spot, especially on the driver's side. To deal with its high solar load, air-conditioning and twin removable interior roof panels are standard.

Interior
Front bucket seats feature three point seatbelts and can tilt and slide forward to give access to the rear.  The rear bench seat features a fixed central arm rest and either two or three point seatbelts.

In its normal interior configuration (with the back seats up and the parcel shelf in place) the rear cargo area does have a noticeably small opening (52 cm by 82 cm) and an elevated lip necessitating the lifting of luggage quite high before it can be placed inside. However the boot (trunk) is relatively deep and spacious. In addition the rear seats fold down and both the parcel shelf and the rear divider panel (usually in place behind the back seats) can be completely removed, in essence turning the entire rear half of the car into a cargo area. As such the Toyota Sera has a large amount of available storage space for its size. The space-saving spare tire and changing kit are contained in a small compartment below the boot floor.

Other features

The Sera/EXY-10 was one of the first cars to feature projector headlights (though the 1988 AXV-II concept model featured conventional headlights).

Importation

As the Sera was only released in the Japanese domestic market, all vehicles are right-hand drive and the speedometer and odometer units are metric. This makes the vehicle readily importable into countries with similar standards and requires only minimal changes for ones such as the United Kingdom (where the vehicles are also right-hand drive but the instruments are in imperial units). However, major alterations may be necessary before the Sera is legal for general use in, or even importation, into other states and countries.

In Australia, most Seras will be required to have three-point seatbelts and side impact beams to be fitted for compliance. As such, it may be beneficial to import a later model Phase III to avoid this third-party work.

Any vehicle over 15 years old can be legally imported to Canada under federal law, so even the newest Seras are now eligible.

Similarly, any vehicle over 25 years old can be legally imported to the United States according to the NHTSA, meaning that these vehicles do not have to comply with federal emissions and safety standards. As a result, all model years of the Sera are eligible as of 2021.

Despite this, however, the Sera cannot be legally registered in some jurisdictions such as California until the vehicle has been heavily modified to meet state emission standards, due to California having more strict smog regulations than other states in the United States as well as "visual inspection" rules.

Phases
Toyota produced the Sera in three distinct trim variants, with either manual or automatic transmission, standard or ABS brakes and regular stereo or Super-Live Sound System ("SLSS" - see below) forming the three major choices for buyers. There were also a large number of additional factory options available across the entire production run.

Phase I (March 1990 – May 1991)
The initial build and the majority of the Sera's total production (around 12,000 of the 15,852 or so cars produced) featured:
 beige/tan interior or greyish blue depending on exterior colour
 bayonet fuel filler cap
 hard-wearing ribbed and woven seat material

Phase II (May 1991 – June 1992)
Around 2,300 cars of this second trim were produced featuring:
 pastel pattern in the main sections of the seats with tan/greyish bolsters depending on interior colour
 screw-type fuel filler cap
 different seat materials

Phase III (June 1992 – December 1995)
1,550 of the final version of the Sera were manufactured, featuring:
 grey interior with seat fabrics that have a secondary colour to complement the exterior colour
 some engine component revisions
 side impact beams in the doors
 optional airbags (which may have been automatically accompanied by ABS)
 three-point rear seat belts (Some very early Phase 3 models had standard lap belts)
 stronger door struts to compensate for the side impact beams
 solid plastic spoiler with LED high-level brake light incorporated (the only external change to the Sera)

The Phase III Sera also featured a limited edition model, the Amlux, named after Toyota's flagship building in Tokyo. The Amlux Building houses the world's largest automobile showroom and is located in Ikebukuro. It is an oval-shaped high rise building that glows purple at night, with a matte-finish look and flashing white strobes.

The Sera special edition Amlux versions were based on the phase III SERA with automatic transmission and SLSS, featuring:
 two-tone green paint
 special colour hubcaps
 blue tinted glass
 choice of 6 special colours of seat material designs
 rear seat cover
 AMLUX logo on mats
 AMLUX logo on door
 personalised name plate on the car
 personalised seat cushion and a special scarf

All Amlux cars were built between September and December 1992. It is believed that 21 of these cars were produced.

Factory options
All Phases of the Toyota Sera came with a range of factory optional extras. The major mechanical option was the Anti-Lock Braking System. Additional options included:
 A variety of logo and stripe stickers
 Car-phone and/or car-fax
 Parking sensors
 Patterned window-tinting
 Roof cover
 Ski-racks (which attached to the doors)
 Smoked perspex upper spoiler
 Striking patterned seat & floormat materials
 Various stereo Head Units

Super Live Surround Sound (SLSS)
One major internal option came in the form of an advanced car audio system known as the Super Live Surround Sound or SLSS. The SLSS comprised a total of 10 speakers; 3 x 10 cm tweeters in the front console (left, right and centre), 2 x 10 cm door-mounted cones (left and right), 2 x tweeters and 2 x cones contained in a single, tube shaped unit mounted on the rear parcel shelf, and a boot fitted 'Acoustic Resonance Woofer' (subwoofer). The SLSS came with a three mode Digital Sound Processor (DSP) which cycled through 'off', 'Casual' or 'Funky' mode by use of a button labelled "WARP" on the CD/Radio or CD/Radio/Cassette head unit. These produced slight differences in sound quality through preset values for settings such as bass and treble, as well as rotating the speakers in the rear unit to either project directly into the car or bounce off the rear window. A complete and functional SLSS is one of the most highly sought after options by Toyota Sera enthusiasts, but by being factory fit is quite hard to retro-fit.

Air filtration/fragrance systems
Sera buyers could also add one of two different styles of electronic air cleanser/fresheners. These came in the form of either a standalone roof mounted filter and interior light unit known as "CleanAce" or an integrated device known as an "Air Fantasy" that was mounted in the centre console beneath the audio head-unit. The roof unit took air in through a vent at the front and ran it out through a filter at the back. The Air Fantasy system was connected to the vehicle's own air-conditioning system and would pump small bursts of scented air (from one of three replaceable scent packs) either automatically or on demand through the air vents. Although the roof unit is relatively common for an optional extra, the Air Fantasy is especially rare.

Fragrances include Deodorizer (White), Morning Green (Orange ), Peppermint (Blue), White Herb (Green) and Sazan Floral (Yellow)

The CleanAce system might have been intended for smokers. There are a number of after-market systems which replace the cabin light and perform a similar job.

Aftermarket variations
Many Toyota Seras have received aftermarket additions or improvements aimed at extending the usable life of the vehicle, improving the overall performance or to rectify commonly perceived issues such as body roll or poor headlight levels.

Engine tuning

By far the most common mechanical improvement is the tuning or complete replacement of the engine (otherwise known as an engine swap). The factory standard 5E-FHE produced  when new, and is the most powerful of the naturally aspirated versions of the Toyota E series. However, with minimal modifications to the car itself, this unit can be replaced with the 4E-FTE engine from the Toyota Starlet GT Turbo ('Glanza') which develops . This has been successfully transplanted in a number of Seras in Japan, Australia and the UK where the 'bolt-on' nature of the change and the relatively cheap price of both the replacement engine and additional parts (due to the large numbers of Starlets produced) make it much more attractive than tuning the existing 5E-FHE with custom parts. The Starlet Turbo can be additionally tuned to give substantially more power (175-200 bhp) than those officially released by Toyota. However, in order to achieve these levels of power it is necessary to make quite a number of changes, such as exchanging the intercooler for a larger version and relocating it to the front bumper, installing a revised exhaust and induction kit, plus a number of electronic engine management devices to alter the fuelling and turbo boost safety points.

At least two Seras in Japan are claimed to have , in Australia they are claimed to have  and one in Sri Lanka claimed to have . These are extremely expensive and specialized conversions as the engines and transmissions have to be strengthened, cooling and fuel issues have to be addressed and several improvements are required to the brakes and handling package.

Handling
Despite its image as a sports coupé, the Sera’s suspension is equipped with much softer springs than expected. To compensate this, an aftermarket handling package is available, developed with the assistance of Leda Suspension. This gives the car a more firmer and sporting driving feel with less pronounced and more progressive body roll characteristics. The car is lowered slightly as well. The kit contains one pair of front dampers, one pair of front progressive rate springs, one pair of rear dampers, and one pair of rear progressive rate springs.
Because of the similarities between the Sera, Paseo/Cynos, & Starlet GT, other parts such as swaybars, strut bars, other braces and brakes can be retrofitted.

Bodykits
There are several designs of full bodykit and sections available for the Sera. Popular amongst these are full kits made by G5 Speed Garage (Japan), Quest Power: Type-A (Japan), Cia Style Kit (UK), X-Racing (Australia). and a rear bumper by Andros (Cyprus), Sera bodykits mainly include redesigned and grounded front bumpers, front splitters, carbon-fibre bonnets, wheelarch trims, wide arch kits, front bumper extensions, side skirts, rear spoilers, headlamp eyelids and body mounted rear wings.

In popular culture
The Sera made an early appearance in the anime television series Patlabor, in Episode 33 of the first series, first broadcast in 1990. Both antagonists and police units make use of the car in this episode. At the time of broadcast, the Sera had made its motor-show debut a year prior in 1989 as the AXV-II Concept. As such, this broadcast appearance of the Sera was important for Toyota advertising. The series is set in a recognisable near-future Tokyo. The presence of the Sera in the series suggested Toyota's commitment to bring the Sera into production.

The Sera was used in the Japanese television series Super Rescue Solbrain which ran for 53 episodes from January 1991 to January 1992. The principal character drives a vehicle called SolGallop which is a Sera with a revised full-length frontal canopy, but there are other less modified cars in police livery in the show.

The Sera was seen in four Bangladeshi films of the 1990s starring actor Salman Shah, who owned the car at that time. The films were Priyojon, Tomake Chai, Prem Piyashi and Chaowa Theke Phaowa. 
It is also featured in the 1999 Indian Tamil-language drama film Padayappa, starring Rajinikanth and Ramya Krishnan, whose character's personal car was the Sera. 
In 2002, a Sera appeared in the Indian Tamil-language romantic drama film Mounam Pesiyadhe.

The YouTube series The Midnight Garage features a black-white-and-grey camo-wrapped Toyota Sera, which replaced their Honda CR-X in 2017.
 
The Sera is also featured as a playable car in the racing simulation video game series Gran Turismo, which first appeared in Gran Turismo 4 and later appeared in Gran Turismo PSP, Gran Turismo 5 as a "standard car" (cars with less-detailed models originating from the PS2-era games), and in Gran Turismo 6 as a simplified car.

References

External links

 Toyota Sera UK Owners Club
 GAZOO.COM Toyota Cera

Front-wheel-drive sports cars
Sera
Cars introduced in 1990
Sport compact cars
Hatchbacks
Coupés
Cars discontinued in 1995